Lorentz Reichwein (c. 1680, in Fåberg – 22 April 1735, in Copenhagen) was a Norwegian and Danish military officer. He was a son of Georg Reichwein, and grandson of Georg Reichwein, Sr. He served as county governor of Akershus, and his final military rank was Major General. He was owner of a land area in central Christiania which later was called Grünings løkke, consisting of the area from the Pipervika Bay to the current Eidsvolls plass.

References

1680 births
1735 deaths
Norwegian Army generals